Smithfield Hog Production Division, formerly Premium Standard Farms, Inc. (PSF), is a subsidiary of Smithfield Foods, Inc. PSF was founded in 1988 with the aim of creating a standardized method to produce premium pork. To accomplish this goal, the company decided to pursue full vertical integration—a first for pork producers in the United States. Premium Standard Farms was the second-largest pork producer and the sixth-largest processor in the United States until Smithfield Foods acquired it in 2007.

Methane harvesting
Valley View Farm, near Green Castle, Missouri, is a finishing site that houses more than 100,000 hogs at any given time. Half of the site's waste lagoons are covered to allow the harvesting of methane gas. In addition to gas harvested from manure lagoons, Smithfield plans to harvest and process prairie grass. The company says 100% of its finishing facilities will have the ability to produce renewable natural gas. Smithfield also has farms that engage in methane harvesting in  Bethany and  Princeton. 

Smithfield built a connection from its farms in northern Missouri to the pipeline that supplies natural gas to Milan, Missouri. Fuel produced by Smithfield is mixed directly into Milan's gas supply. This project took 18 months.

Smithfield has formed a partnership with Roeslein Alternative Energy, Monarch Bioenergy, to help produce biogas. In early 2020, Smithfield and Roesleing Alternative Energy announced an additional $45 million investment in Monarch. This money will be used to expand Monarch's renewable natural gas capture and distribution to at least 85% of Smithfield's Missouri farms.

Smithfield's gas harvesting efforts are part of its stated goal of reducing its greenhouse gas footprint by 25%. This is using the company's 2010 emissions as the base for calculation.

Acquisition by Smithfield Foods
Smithfield acquired Premium Standard Farms for $810 million in cash and stock. Smithfield also assumed $117 million dollars in debt. Smithfield paid a 20 percent premium over Premium Standard's stock price.

Litigation
2010, a Jackson County, Missouri, jury awarded seven neighboring farmers $11 million in damages for odors emanating from a 4,300 acre finishing farm near Berlin in Gentry County, Missouri where an estimated 200,000 hogs are processed annually. In 2006, six plaintiffs were awarded $4.6 million. The settlement was the largest in a hog farm odor issue. It was filed in 1999.

References

External links
 Archived official website of Premium Standard Farms

Agriculture companies of the United States
Companies based in Missouri
Food manufacturers of the United States
Meat companies of the United States
Smithfield Foods brands
Food and drink companies established in 1988
1988 establishments in Missouri
2005 initial public offerings
2007 mergers and acquisitions